Tim Thackrey (born October 1, 1979) is a retired taekwondo athlete for the USA & current strength & conditioning coach for Olympians & professional athletes. He was a seven-time US National Team Member in the flyweight class (-58 kg, 127.6 lbs) from 2000 through 2007. Notably, he won a gold medal at the 2003 Pan American Games and a bronze medal at the 2003 World Championships. He was a resident athlete at the US Olympic Training Center in Colorado Springs, CO from 2001-2003. In 2006, he was named USA Taekwondo's Male Athlete of the Year.

Thackrey is a graduate of UCLA where he attended undergraduate and graduate school, as 5 year Coach of the UCLA Taekwondo Program.

Coach
Thackrey currently works as a professional strength & conditioning coach that works with Olympians and professional athletes. He had multiple athletes in the 2016 Summer Olympics including the USA's Stephen Lambdin and New Zealand's Andrea Kilday. Thackrey has also returned several times to coach Junior and Senior athletes at the United States Olympic Training Center.

Achievements
2000-2007 US National Team - [Fly]
2002 US Open - [Fly] - Bronze 
2002 Pan Am Taekwondo Championships - [Fly] - Bronze 
2003 US Open - [Fly]
2003/2007 US Pan Am Games Team Member [Fly]
2003 Pan Am Games - Dominican Republic [Fly] Gold
2003 World Championships - Germany [Fly] - Bronze
2006 Pan Am Taekwondo Championships - [Fly] - Bronze
2006 Pan Am Games Qualification [Fly] - Silver
2006 Dutch Open - Gold
2006 German Open - Silver
2006 US Open - Bantam - Bronze
2006 USA Athlete of the Year
2012 CrossFit SoCal Regional Competitor
2012 American Open Weightlifting Qualification

TV and podcasts
Thackrey appeared in TV shows & podcasts as a strength & conditioning expert, including The Talk where he taught CrossFit to the hosts including Sharon Osbourne and Aisha Tyler, and the WOD Cast Podcast where he spoke about his athletic competitions.

References

External links
 Tim Thackrey's profile from the official website of United States Olympic Committee

1979 births
Living people
American male taekwondo practitioners
Taekwondo practitioners at the 2007 Pan American Games
Place of birth missing (living people)
Pan American Games gold medalists for the United States
Pan American Games medalists in taekwondo
World Taekwondo Championships medalists
Medalists at the 2003 Pan American Games